Putative adenosylhomocysteinase 2 is an enzyme that in humans is encoded by the AHCYL1 gene.

Interactions
AHCYL1 has been shown to interact with ITPR1.

References

External links

Further reading